Statehood Day or National Day is a holiday celebrated every 15 February in Serbia to commemorate the outbreak of the First Serbian Uprising in 1804, which evolved into the Serbian Revolution against Ottoman rule. The revolution ultimately resulted in the recognition of Serbia by the Ottoman Empire (formally in 1817, de jure in 1835).

On the same day in 1835, during the rule of Miloš Obrenović, the first modern Serbian constitution was adopted in Kragujevac, known as the Sretenje Constitution or 'Candlemas Constitution'.

National Day is a public national holiday, and official celebrations last for two days, every 15 February.

Interesting facts
Google Doodles commemorated Serbian National Day in 2012, 2013, 2014, 2015, 2016, 2017, 2018, 2019, 2020, 2021, 2022 and 2023 as well as Facebook in 2016.

See also
 Statehood Day (disambiguation) in other countries
 List of national independence days
 Public holidays in Serbia
 Sretenje

References

February observances
Public holidays in Serbia
Observances in Serbia
Winter events in Serbia
National days